Paddy O'Shea (born 12 April 1981 in Cork, Ireland) is an Irish sportsperson. He plays Gaelic football with his local club St Vincent's and was substitute goalkeeper on the senior Cork county team from 2002 onwards.

References

1981 births
Living people
Cork inter-county Gaelic footballers
Gaelic football goalkeepers
St Vincent's (Cork) Gaelic footballers